Colt is a town and an unincorporated area in St. Francis County, Arkansas, United States. The population was 378 at the 2010 census, an increase from 368 in 2000.

Geography
Colt is located at  (35.130750, -90.811261).

Demographics

At the 2000 census, there were 368 people, 163 households and 111 families residing in the town. The racial makeup of the town was 94.02% White, 5.43% Black or African American, 0.54% from other races. 0.54% of the population were Hispanic or Latino of any race.

There were 163 households, of which 27.6% had children under the age of 18 living with them, 55.8% were married couples living together, 7.4% had a female householder with no husband present, and 31.9% were non-families. 30.1% of all households were made up of individuals, and 13.5% had someone living alone who was 65 years of age or older. The average household size was 2.26 and the average family size was 2.77.

Age distribution was 22.8% under the age of 18, 9.2% from 18 to 24, 29.3% from 25 to 44, 24.7% from 45 to 64, and 13.9% who were 65 years of age or older. The median age was 38 years. For every 100 females, there were 94.7 males. For every 100 females age 18 and over, there were 94.5 males.

The median household income was $31,250, and the median family income was $37,000. Males had a median income of $31,000 versus $19,375 for females. The per capita income for the town was $14,958. About 11.7% of families and 13.7% of the population were below the poverty line, including 19.5% of those under age 18 and 15.9% of those age 65 or over.

Transportation
The main Highways of Colt are Arkansas State Routes 1 and 306.  The two routes cross each other in the middle of the town.  The Delta Regional Airport serves as the city's primary airport.  Rail Service is provided by the Union Pacific.

Education
Forrest City School District operates public schools serving the community. Forrest City High School is the local high school.

Notable people
Charlie Rich - multiple Grammy Award winning country artist was born in Colt.
William A. Lyon - New York Herald Tribune Financial reporter from 1923 to 1954, Superintendent of Banks in New York State from 1950-1955 and Chairman of the Dry Dock Savings Bank in New York form 1966 to 1970

References

Encyclopedia of Arkansas History & Culture

Cities in Arkansas
Cities in St. Francis County, Arkansas